World NTD Day is an awareness day for addressing neglected tropical diseases (NTDs).

The first World NTD Day was on January 30, 2020.

January 30 is the anniversary of the landmark 2012 London Declaration on NTDs, which unified partners across sectors, countries and disease communities to push for greater investment and action on NTDs.

2020 is a special year for the global health response to NTDs WHO is expected to launch new goals during the year to guide progress against NTDs until 2030.

Reem Al Hashimi announced the event on behalf of the government of the United Arab Emirates (UAE) on November 19, 2019, at the Reach the Last Mile Forum. The UAE has invested significant sums in efforts to fight NTDs.

On the third World NTD Day in 2022, the Kigali Declaration on Neglected Tropical Diseases, a successor project of the London Declaration, was announced, and was officially launched by Paul Kagame, President of the Republic of Rwanda, at the Kigali Summit on Malaria and NTDs.

References

External links
 

Health awareness days
Tropical diseases